The Frankfurt Book Fair (German: Frankfurter Buchmesse,  FBM) is the world's largest trade fair for books, based on the number of publishing companies represented. It is considered to be the most important book fair in the world for international deals and trading. The five-day annual event in mid-October is held at the Frankfurt Trade Fair grounds in Frankfurt am Main, Germany. The first three days are restricted exclusively to professional visitors; the general public attend the fair on the weekend.

Several thousand exhibitors representing book publishing, multimedia and technology companies, as well as content providers from all over the world gather in order to negotiate international publishing rights and license fees. The fair is organised by Frankfurter Buchmesse GmbH, a subsidiary of the German Publishers and Booksellers Association. More than 7,300 exhibitors from over 100 countries and more than 286,000 visitors took part in the year 2017.

History

The Frankfurt Book Fair has a tradition spanning more than 500 years. Before the advent of printed books, the general trade fair in Frankfurt was the place for selling handwritten books, as early as the 12th century. A printers' and publishers' fair became established sometime in the decades after Johannes Gutenberg developed printing in movable letters in Mainz near Frankfurt; although no official founding date of the Frankfurt Book Fair is documented, it had definitely been established by 1462, the year that the printers Johann Fust and Peter Schöffer, who had taken over Gutenberg's printing operations after a legal dispute, moved their operations to Frankfurt.

The fair became the primary point for book marketing, but also a hub for the diffusion of written texts. During the Reformation, the fair was attended by merchants testing the market for new books and by scholars looking for newly available scholarship.

Until the end of the 17th century, the Frankfurt Book Fair was the most important book fair in Europe. It was eclipsed in 1632 by the Leipzig Book Fair during the Enlightenment as a consequence of political and cultural developments. After World War II, the first book fair was held again in 1949 at the St. Paul's Church. Since then, it has regained its preeminent position.

Significance
The Frankfurter Buchmesse is the world's largest trade fair for books, based on the number of publishing companies represented. It is considered to be the most important book fair in the world for international deals and trading. It is a critical marketing event for launching books and to facilitate the negotiation of the international sale of rights and licences. 
Book publishing-, multimedia- and technology companies, as well as content providers from all over the world gather. Publishers, agents, booksellers, librarians, academics, illustrators, service providers, film producers, translators, professional and trade associations, institutions, artists, authors, antiquarians, software and multimedia suppliers all participate in the events. 
Visitors take the opportunity to obtain information about the publishing market, to network, and to do business.

Organisation 
The fair is organised by Frankfurter Buchmesse GmbH, a subsidiary of the German Publishers and Booksellers Association. The five-day annual event in mid-October is held at the Frankfurt Trade Fair grounds in Frankfurt am Main, Germany. The first three days are restricted exclusively to trade visitors; the general public can attend on the weekend, for a fee.

In 2009, 7,314 exhibitors from some 100 countries presented over 400,000 books. Some 300,000 visitors attended the fair.

In 2016, more than 10,000 journalists from 75 countries reported on the fair, which brought together 7,135 exhibitors from 106 countries, and more than 172,296 trade visitors.

Events and joint ventures

The Peace Prize of the German Book Trade has been awarded at the fair each year since 1950 during a ceremony in the Frankfurter Paulskirche.

The fair awards the Bookseller/Diagram Prize for Oddest Title of the Year, humoring the book with the oddest title.

Certain initiatives would not exist without the Frankfurter Buchmesse and are closely linked to its goals and, up to a point, management structure.

On the occasion of the 1980 Fair, Litprom was founded – the Society for the Promotion of African, Asian and Latin American Literature. As a non profit association, it monitors literary trends and selects the best examples of creative writing from Africa, Asia and Latin America for translation into German. It promotes them in Germany, Switzerland and Austria by encouraging contacts between authors and publishers from the Third World and those in German-speaking countries. It serves as an information hub and clearing house about literature from Africa, Asia and Latin America, establishing a forum of debate about "Third World" literature.

In 2006, Litcam, a campaign against illiteracy was founded. In this context, the 2007 Frankfurt Book Fair also started a short story project named "Who's on the line? Call for free" by and for people with migration background.

Guest of honour, focus of interest

Since 1976, a guest of honour, or a focus of interest is named for the fair. A special literary programme is organised for the occasion (readings, arts exhibitions, public discussion panels, theatre productions, and radio and TV programmes). A special exhibition hall is set up for the guest country, and the major publishing houses are present at the fair.  Canada's presentation as 2020 guest of honour was postponed to 2021 due to the COVID-19 pandemic.

Controversy 
The 2007 fair attracted criticism from both the Spanish and German media. German news magazine Der Spiegel described it as "closed-minded" for its policy of not including the many Catalans who write in Spanish in its definition of Catalan literature. The decision to exclude any element of "Spanishness", defined as literature exclusively done in Spanish, from the fair was made in spite of the fact that the Spanish government contributed more than €6 million towards the cost of the fair.

See also

Peace Prize of the German Book Trade
German Book Prize
 Books in Germany

References

External links

Culture in Frankfurt
Trade fairs in Germany
Book fairs in Germany
Tourist attractions in Frankfurt